Dorothy McRae-McMahon (born 1934) is a retired Australian Uniting Church minister and activist, formerly Minister at Pitt Street Uniting Church—known for its human rights work and local "street level" activism.

McRae-McMahon has been a feminist Christian trailblazer since the 1970s. Involved in women's liberation, human rights, anti-apartheid, anti-Vietnam War and in religious and spiritual matters.

Coming out as a lesbian at the age of 50, McRae-McMahon created a major stir and homophobic attacks, engendering public discussion and acceptance of homosexual clergy.

McRae-McMahon volunteers at a Uniting Church parish, co-edits the South Sydney Herald, speaks at public forums and writes.

Early life, marriage and children 

Dorothy McRae was born in 1934 in Zeehan, Tasmania, Australia where her Methodist Minister father had been appointed to his first parish. She married Barrie McMahon in 1956 and lived in Melbourne, Victoria. Originally a pre-school teacher, McRae-McMahon spent 16 years at home caring for her four children, born between 1957 and 1969: Christopher Barrie, Robert Anthony, Lindy Louise and Melissa. The eldest, Christopher had an intellectual disability and went into autistic withdrawal shortly after Robert's birth.  In 1964 the family moved to Sydney, where McRae-McMahon joined the Australian Labor Party and became involved in peace activism.

In 1987 McRae-McMahon ended her marriage, recognising herself as a lesbian, an identity she made public in 1997, declaring that she had been living in a committed same-sex relationship for many years.

Work and activism

McRae-McMahon began her training in the ordained ministry of the Uniting Church in 1976. On ordination in 1982 she was appointed to Sydney's Pitt Street Church where she gathered a congregation committed to a range of activist causes. Their involvement in the anti-apartheid cause attracted the attention of right wing group National Action, which led to a campaign of harassment against the Minister and her congregation.

McRae-McMahon has been a Minister in the Uniting Church, a National Director for Mission of the Uniting Church in Australia (1993) and was the first woman to become Moderator of the World Council of Churches Worship Committee. She was instrumental in 'Mothers and Others for Peace', 'Christian Women Concerned', the first Church Commission on the Status of Women and the journal MAGDALENE.

In 1997 McRae-McMahon came out as a lesbian at the National Assembly of the Uniting Church in Perth. She resigned from her position later that year. An episode of "Australian Story" was broadcast by the Australian Broadcasting Corporation about her life, family and relationship with the Uniting Church.

McRae-McMahon became a leader in the successful campaign to have homosexual ministers formally accepted by the Uniting Church, arguing that homosexuality is a sign of wholeness rather than moral decay.

McRae-McMahon had occupied a position of power within the Uniting Church but found she was more comfortable embracing a theology of moving to the edge—believing 'the margins are the places where Christ is closest to us'.

Published works
McRae-McMahon, D. (1993) "Echoes of our Journey: liturgies of the people", Joint Board of Christian Education: Melbourne, Vic
McRae-McMahon, D. (1992, 1994). "Being Clergy, Staying Human, taking our stand in the river", Alban Institute: Washington DC
McRae-McMahon, D. (1996) "The Glory of Blood, Sweat and tears: liturgies for living and dying", Joint Board of Christian Education: Melbourne, Vic 
McCrae-McMahon, D. (1998) "Everyday Passions: A Conversation on Living", ABC Books: Sydney, NSW 
McRae-McMahon, D. (2000). "Embracing Diversity: new communities of justice in the 21st century", Anglicare : Hobart, Tasmania
McRae-McMahon, D. (2000) "Liturgies for the Journey of Life", SPCK: London
McRae-McMahon, D., Fidler, R. and Cleary, P. (2001) "What Kind of Republic for Australia?: Direct electionists discuss models and strategies in the aftermath of the 1999 referendum defeat", A Just Republic: Broadway, NSW 
McRae-McMahon, D. (2001). "Prayers for life's particular moments", Desbooks, Thornbury, Vic
McRae-McMahon, D. (2001). "Daring Leadership for the 21st Century", ABC Books, Sydney, NSW
McRae-McMahon, D. (2001). "In this Hour: memories for pausing", Desbooks: Thornbury, Vic
Maher, T., McRae-McMahon, D., McAvoy, T. (2002) "Why an Australian Republic needs a Bill of Rights", A Just Republic: Broadway, NSW
McRae-McMahon, D. (2003, 2010) "Rituals for Life, Love, Loss", Jane Curry Publishing, Paddington, NSW
McRae-McMahon, D. (2004) "Memoirs of Moving On: A life of faith, passion and resilience", Jane Curry Publishing, Paddington, NSW
McRae-McMahon, D. (2004) "Liturgies for Daily Life", SPCK: London
McRae-McMahon, D. (2005) "Worship for the Young in Years", Mediacom Education: Adelaide, SA
McRae-McMahon, D. (2007). "Liturgies for high days", Mediacom Education, Unley, SA 
Gale, F., Bolzan, N., McRae-McMahon, D., (Ed) (2007) "Spirited Practices:  spirituality and the helping professions", Allen & Unwin: Crows Nest, NSW
McRae-McMahon, D. (2009) "In life and in death: liturgies for harder times", Mediacom Education: Unley, SA
McRae-McMahon, D. and Sydney Barbara Metrick  (2014). "Rituals for Life, Love and Loss: Prayers and Meditations for Marriage, Birthdays, Baby Naming Loss and grief", Turner House an imprint of Turner Publishing Company: NY
McRae-McMahon, D. (2013) "A life and death conversation with Ali", Mediacom Education: Unley, SA
McRae-McMahon, D. (2015) "Deeply Connected: how to write liturgy", Mediacom Education Inc : Unley, SA

Contributions
McRae-McMahon, with Tony Fitzgerald QC and John Uhr, contributed the foreword to Noel Preston's 2006 book, "Beyond the Boundary : a memoir exploring ethics, politics and spirituality", Zeus publications : Burleigh, Queensland.

Honours, decorations, awards and distinctions
1977: Jubilee Medal from the Queen for work with women in NSW.
1987: Australian Government Peace Medal.
1988: Australian Human Rights Medal. 
1992: Honorary Doctorate of Letters from Macquarie University for her work with minorities and contribution to the spiritual life of the community.
2014: Grand Stirrer award recipient, Edna Ryan Awards.
2016: Community Hero Award ACON Awards.

Notes and references

External links
 Dorothy McRae-McMahon on The Australian Women's Register
 Interview with Dorothy McRae-McMahon, Sydney Oral Histories, City of Sydney
 Dorothy McRae-McMahon in Conservation with Richard Fidler, ABC Radio, Sydney

1934 births
Living people
Uniting Church in Australia ministers
People from Zeehan
Australian lesbians
LGBT Protestant clergy
LGBT Unitarian Universalists
21st-century Australian LGBT people